The following events occurred in November 1965:

November 1, 1965 (Monday)
The charter of Asian Development Bank was drafted in Manila.
King Mohammed Zahir Shah appointed Mohammad Hashim Maiwandwal as the new Prime Minister of Afghanistan, replacing Mohammad Yusuf, who had been dismissed the previous Friday. Maindawal, who had served as the Afghan ambassador to the United States as well as the United Kingdom and Pakistan, would serve until November 1, 1967. After Afghanistan's declaration of a republic in 1973, Maindawal would be arrested on charges of attempting to overthrow President Mohammed Daoud Khan and would die in prison.
In Egypt, a trolleybus plunged into the Nile River at Dokki, a suburb of Cairo, drowning 74 people. Most of the dead were high school students who were on their way home from school. Only 19 passengers survived, breaking windows or escaping from open doors to free themselves.
The subpanel for Gemini VI of the Agena Flight Safety Review Board met at Lockheed. The subpanel, chaired by Colonel John B. Hudson, Deputy Commander for Launch Vehicles, Air Force Space Systems Division, reviewed Lockheed's flight safety analysis of the failure of Gemini Agena target vehicle (GATV) 5002 on October 25. The subpanel approved the conclusions reached by Lockheed's analysts, that the catastrophic anomaly was apparently caused by a "hard start" of the Agena's main engine, most probably resulting from a fuel rather than oxidizer lead into the thrust chamber before ignition. Unlike all previous standard Agenas, the GATV had been intentionally sequenced for a fuel lead to conserve oxidizer for the many programmed restarts. The subpanel reported its findings to the parent board on November 3.
Saturn/Apollo Applications Deputy Director John H. Disher summarized for the Director of Advanced Manned Missions those tasks of highest priority for supporting development during Fiscal Year 1966. Those tasks, Disher explained, had been examined in great detail because of stringent funding constraints for Apollo Applications during 1966 and 1967. Therefore, he had listed only those tasks mandatory for the program's "mainstream" requirements. They included such areas as low-thrust reaction control engines, structural and hatch seals, navigation computer modifications, and study of space rescue systems.

November 2, 1965 (Tuesday)
Israel's Prime Minister Levi Eshkol retained his office as parliamentary elections were held for the Knesset. Eshkol's Mapai party and its alignment with the Ahdut HaAvoda lost five seats but retained 45 of the 120 available.
Banks and newspapers in the Dominican Republic reopened for business for the first time in more than five months. All banks in the downtown district of Santo Domingo had been closed since April 24 during the outbreak of violence following a coup, and the independent newspapers El Caribe and Listin Diario had been shut down since April 28.
Republican John Lindsay was elected Mayor of New York City, narrowly defeating Democrat challenger (and future mayor) Abe Beame.
The United States Treasury Department announced an embargo, effective November 10, banning "imports of wigs made with human hair from Red China".
The Houston Methodist Hospital in Texas reported that it was the first to begin regular use of the new technology of "an instrument which makes possible the continuous monitoring of the vital signs of both mother and child", now commonly known as the fetal heart monitor. Initially, the instrument was used only when the mother was in labor.
Born: Shahrukh Khan, Indian film actor, producer and TV host, in New Delhi
Died: Norman Morrison, 31, American Quaker, of burns suffered when he set himself on fire in front of The Pentagon, in protest against the Vietnam War. Morrison was holding his one-year-old daughter as he doused himself in kerosene, and was reportedly still holding her as he began to burn, letting the child go after horrified onlookers yelled 'Drop the baby!" The child was rescued, unharmed, and Mr. Morrison was dead on arrival at the Fort Myer dispensary. Morrison had set himself ablaze  from, and within sight of, the office of U.S. Defense Secretary Robert S. McNamara, who would write 30 years later, "Morrison's death was a tragedy not only for his family, but also for me and the country." North Vietnam would memorialize him with a postage stamp and named a street after him.

November 3, 1965 (Wednesday)
Edward Bond's play Saved was performed for the first time, presented in its entirety in a private session by players and an audience made up of members of the English Stage Society, after Britain's Lord Chamberlain's Office had allowed only a heavily censored version for public audiences. Under the Theatres Act 1843, all scripts for British plays had to be sent to the Lord Chamberlain for approval, and even a "sanitized" version of Saved had been sent back with directions to make more than 30 cuts from the script, including entire scenes. The protest by the drama community would eventually lead to the Theatres Act 1968, abolishing censorship of plays.
Only six people survived the sinking of the Jose Marti, a fishing boat that was carrying 25 men, nine women and 11 children who were refugees from Cuba. According to a spokesman from the Mexican Navy, the overcrowded boat "just came to pieces" while  short of its destination in Mexico, breaking up near Isla Contoy.
An Argentine Air Force transport plane crashed into the sea while flying from Balboa-Howard Air Force Base in Panama, toward San Salvador, El Salvador, killing all 60 passengers and the crew of nine. The passengers were 55 Air Force cadets and five officers who were one of two groups who were en route to a tour of the United States. More than 50 years later, no trace of the airplane had ever been found.
Martin-Baltimore received the propellant tanks for Gemini launch vehicle (GLV) 11 from Martin-Denver, which had begun fabricating them June 28. They were shipped by rail October 27. The GLV-11 stage II fuel tank was used in GLV-10, and the stage II fuel tank from GLV-12 was reassigned to GLV-11, arriving by air from Martin-Denver January 16, 1966. Aerojet-General delivered the engines for GLV-11 on December 14, 1965. Stage I tank splicing and engine installation was complete by March 31, stage II by April 5. Stage I horizontal tests ended April 12 and stage II, April 25.
The Agena Flight Safety Review Board met at Lockheed to continue its investigation of the failure of Gemini Agena target vehicle 5002 on October 25. The board, chaired by George E. Mueller, NASA Associate Administrator of Manned Space Flight, reviewed the findings of the subpanel for Gemini VI and reached the same conclusion: the failure resulted from a hard start probably caused by the fuel lead. The next day the board presented its recommendation to Air Force Space Systems Division for a contractural change covering a program to modify the design of the Model 8247 main rocket engine to revert to oxidizer lead. Design verification testing would follow. Existing engines would be recycled through Bell Aerosystems to allow the incorporation of the design modifications. Since two existing engines would be used for design verification testing, two new engines were to be procured as replacements.
Born: Ann Scott, French novelist, in Paris

November 4, 1965 (Thursday)
Pavshie i zhivye (The Fallen and Living), by Soviet playwright Yuri Lyubimov, premiered at the Taganka Theatre in Moscow after the Ministry of Culture had ordered 19 changes in its script. By 1968, hardliners within the Communist Party would condemn even the censored version of the play as a departure from the official Party policy.
Charles de Gaulle (just short of his 75th birthday) announced that he would stand for re-election on December 5 in pursuit of another seven-year term as President of the French Republic.
The Food and Agriculture Act of 1965 was signed into law by U.S. President Lyndon Johnson.
Harvard University botany professor Elso Barghoorn announced the discovery of the earliest evidence of life on Earth, with the finding of fossil evidence from three billion years in the past. The organisms, bacteria only one half of a micron long, were detected by electron microscope evaluation in October.
She was driving her husband's jet-powered race car, the Spirit of America, on the Bonneville Salt Flats in Utah.
The Ned Rorem opera Miss Julie was premiered by the New York City Opera.
Born: Wayne Static (Wayne Richard Wells), American heavy metal musician and lead vocalist for the band Static-X; in Muskegon, Michigan (died of overdose, 2014)
Died: Dickey Chapelle, 46, American photojournalist, became the first war correspondent to be killed in the Vietnam War, and the first female American reporter to die in combat. Chapelle was mortally wounded when a land mine exploded in front of her while she was accompanying a platoon of U.S. Marines near Chu Lai.

November 5, 1965 (Friday)
A three-month state of emergency was declared in Southern Rhodesia by British colonial Governor Humphrey Gibbs, who said that the British colony's security was being threatened by Prime Minister Ian Smith's agitation for independence from the United Kingdom, and by two African nationalist organizations, Joshua Nkomo's Zimbabwe African People's Union, and Reverend Ndabaningi Sithole's Zimbabwe African National Union.
The United Nations General Assembly voted, 82 to 9, to demand that the United Kingdom use military force against Rhodesia if it made a unilateral declaration of independence.
Died: Ho Thi Que, 38, Vietnamese fighter known as "The Tiger Lady of South Vietnam", was killed during an argument with her husband, Major Nguyen Van Dan.

November 6, 1965 (Saturday)
The Italian luxury ocean liner Raffaello arrived in Genoa with 56 injured passengers, six days after a fire had crippled the ship in the middle of the Atlantic Ocean.
Troops from Chile and Argentina fought at their border in the Laguna del Desierto incident.
Representatives of the United States and Cuba signed a Memorandum of Understanding brokered through the government of Switzerland, agreeing to begin "Freedom Flights" from Cuba to the U.S. for families whose names were on both nations' lists of Cuban applicants who had family in the states. Under the pact, the United States would pay for the air transport and use its own aircraft, and Cuba would allow officials of the U.S. Public Health Service and the U.S. Immigration and Naturalization Service to maintain offices at the Varadero airport to screen passengers before their embarkation. By the time of the service's end in 1971, more than 250,000 Cubans would take advantage of the program.
The United States launched GEOS-1 (GeodeticEarth Orbiting Satellite), the first cartographic satellite, at 1:39 in the afternoon from Cape Kennedy. GEOS Project Director Jerome Rosenberg told reporters, "We've got a satellite that's just peachy-dandy", and said that it was equipped with four high-powered flashing lights, laser beam reflectors and three sets of radio gear that would provide the data to produce the most accurate maps in history, precisely locate long-range missile targets, and measure the Earth's dips and bulges with unprecedented accuracy. It was the first payload to be launched by a Delta E rocket.

The prototype of the new Chinook ACH-47A helicopter gunship was given its first test flight by Boeing Vertol. Delivery was made to the U.S. Army the following month, and a trio of the ACH-47As would enter combat in May.
Died:
Edgard Varèse, 81, French classical composer
Clarence Williams, 67, American jazz composer

November 7, 1965 (Sunday)
The Pillsbury Company's famous mascot, the Pillsbury Doughboy (officially known as "Poppin' Fresh"), made his debut, appearing for the first time in a television commercial for dough for crescent rolls.  Created by advertising executive Rudolph Perz, the TV ads used stop-motion animation that required 720 separate photographs for a 30-second film.
Parliamentary elections were held in Portugal, at the time under the dictatorship of Antonio Salazar, although the only candidates remaining on the ballot were those of Salazar's National Union Party.  All candidates from opposition parties had withdrawn the previous month, charging that the elections were not democratic.  Interior Minister Alfred dos Santos commented that the 70 percent turnout of the electorate was proof "that the opposition would have received only an insignificant number of votes" and that "none of their candidates would have been elected."
The government of Israel appointed boards of trustees to administer the waqf lands released to Muslim ownership, with the first towns (Haifa, Acre, Lod and Ramla) having boards of between five and seven Muslim residents to control the lands within the restrictions of the Tel Aviv government.
Félix Houphouët-Boigny, the first President of the Republic of Ivory Coast, was re-elected to another five-year term without opposition.  He would win elections in 1970, 1975, 1980 and 1990 and continue to preside over the West African nation until his death on December 7, 1993.
Born: Sigrun Wodars, East German Olympic athlete and gold medalist in the women's 800 meters in 1988, as well as winner of the 1987 world championship; in Neu Kaliss
Died:
Mirza Basheer-ud-Din Mahmood Ahmad, 76, Indian cleric and the second Caliph of the Ahmadiyya Muslim Community, serving for more than 50 years.
Herbert C. Bonner, 74, U.S. Representative for North Carolina since 1940
Henry Solomons, 63, British member of the House of Commons, died in a hospital on his birthday.  With the death of a second Labour Party member in three months, Labour held only a 313 seats to the opposition's total of 312 in the House of Commons (Conservative 303 and Liberal 9), making the November 11 by-election even more important.

November 8, 1965 (Monday)
While carrying out Operation Hump, the U.S. Army's 173rd Airborne Division was ambushed by over 1,200 Viet Cong. The tragedy (and the date) would be referred to in a 2006 country music hit, "8th of November".
The British Indian Ocean Territory was created, three days after the Council of Ministers of Mauritius agreed that the other islands (the Chagos Archipelago, and three of the Seychelles Islands — Aldabra, Farquhar and Des Roches — should be a separate territory before the residents voted on independence. On June 23, 1976, when the Seychelles became an independent nation, Aldabra, Farquhar and Des Roches would be made part of that country.
The Murder (Abolition of Death Penalty) Act 1965 was given Royal Assent, suspending the death penalty for murder in the United Kingdom. Renewal of the Act in 1969 would make the abolition permanent.
Voting for Canada's House of Commons took place, and although Prime Minister Lester B. Pearson's Liberal Party retained control and gained one seat, the Liberals won only 128 of the 265 seats, five short of majority. The Conservative Party of John G. Diefenbaker had 99 seats, a gain of seven.
The Combined Systems Acceptance Test of Gemini launch vehicle (GLV) 8 was conducted at Martin-Baltimore. The vehicle acceptance team convened November 16 and completed its inspection November 19, deeming the vehicle excellent. GLV-8 was deerected December 13-14 and was formally accepted by the U.S. Air Force on December 23. Stage I was airlifted to Cape Kennedy on January 4, 1966, followed by stage II on January 6. Both stages were placed in storage.
Manned Spacecraft Center announced that Elliot M. See, Jr., had been selected as command pilot and Charles A. Bassett II as pilot for the Gemini IX mission. The backup crew would be Thomas P. Stafford, command pilot, and Eugene A. Cernan, pilot. The mission, scheduled for the third quarter of 1966, would last from two to three days and would include rendezvous and docking and extravehicular activity. Bassett was slated to remain outside the Gemini spacecraft for at least one revolution and to wear the manned maneuvering unit backpack, a self-propelled hydrogen-peroxide system with gyro stabilization designed by the Air Force.
Returning to the campus of his alma mater at Southwest Texas State Teachers College (now Texas State University), President Johnson signed the Higher Education Act of 1965 into law, creating a federal program of grants and government loans with the objective that no American high school graduate would be turned away from college for lack of funds.
The soap opera Days of Our Lives was broadcast for the first time, on NBC television in the United States. Starring Macdonald Carey as "Dr. Thomas Horton, well-known and respected cardiologist and leading citizen in the small community of Salem", the daytime serial would continue 50 years later to follow the problems of the Horton family. It would relocate from NBC television to NBC's Peacock video streaming service in 2022.
American Airlines Flight 383 crashed on approach to the Greater Cincinnati Airport, killing 58 of the 62 people on board. The U.S. Federal Aviation Agency concluded that the accident was a result of pilot error, with the crew flying "in a manner that would greatly expedite their arrival at the Cincinnati Airport" and that "both pilots became preoccupied in maintaining visual contact with the runway, resulting in inattention to and improper monitoring of the altitude reference instruments." One of the four survivors was record producer and music journalist Israel Horowitz. The site itself was on the opposite side of the Ohio River from the College of Mount Saint Joseph in Delhi Township, Ohio.
Died: Dorothy Kilgallen, 52, American newspaper, radio and television journalist, was found dead in her townhouse on Manhattan's East 68th Street.

November 9, 1965 (Tuesday)

In the Philippine presidential election, Ferdinand Marcos, leader of the Philippine Senate, defeated incumbent President Diosdado Macapagal. Marcos, who would assume increasingly dictatorial powers until being deposed in 1986, received 3,861,324 votes for a 51.9% majority, while President Macapagal got 3,187,752.
Howard College, located in Birmingham, Alabama, was officially renamed Samford University at the annual meeting of the Alabama Baptist Commission. The historically white college, founded in 1842, had been named for a British philanthropist, John Howard, but the name was similar to the historically black Howard University in Washington, D.C., founded in 1867 by General Oliver O. Howard. The new name was in honor of an Alabama philanthropist, Frank P. Samford.

A massive electrical outage swept across nearly 80,000 square miles (207,000 square kilometers) of the northeast United States and Canada, leaving almost 30 million people in the dark or trapped inside elevators and subway trains. At 5:16 in the afternoon, one of the five electrical lines of the Adam Beck station in Queenston, Ontario, was shut down by an improperly set circuit breaker. It was determined later that engineers had set the safety shutdown of one relay at a level so close "that it would be triggered by the slightest overload" without informing the station's operators of the adjustment. A minor power surge in the surrounding area caused the breaker to trip, shifting the power of five lines to the four remaining lines, which overloaded, shifting their load to neighboring utilities and creating a cascading effect. By 5:28, power had failed in Ontario and Quebec, and the U.S. states of Connecticut, Massachusetts, New Hampshire, New Jersey, New York, Pennsylvania, Rhode Island and Vermont, including most of New York City, for as long as 13 1⁄2 hours.
Born: Bryn Terfel, Welsh operatic bass-baritone, as Bryn Terfel Jones in Pant Glas, Caernarfonshire

November 10, 1965 (Wednesday)
In Shanghai, Chinese historian and playwright Wu Han came under sharp criticism from literary critic Yao Wenyuan, who attacked Wu's popular opera, Hai Rui Dismissed from Office as having a subversive meaning.  Although the opera was a historical drama based on the life of a Chinese minister who courageously criticized Emperor Jiajing 400 years earlier, Yao wrote in the cultural newspaper Wenhui bao that Wu's opera was an allegory about criticizing Communist Party leader Mao Zedong, and that "Its influence is great and its poison widespread.  If we do not clean it up, it will be harmful to the affairs of the people."  Yao's article initially was ignored, but would then be reprinted nationwide on November 29, making the article "the 'first bugle call' of the Cultural Revolution."  Wu would become one of the first of thousands of people to be denounced and imprisoned in the years to follow.
Died: Roger Allen LaPorte, 22, American Catholic Worker Movement member, of burns suffered when he set himself on fire in front of the Dag Hammarskjöld Library in New York City on the previous day, in protest against the Vietnam War.

November 11, 1965 (Thursday)
The government of Turkey's new Prime Minister, Süleyman Demirel, survived its first vote of confidence in the Grand National Assembly, winning approval by a 252 to 172 margin.
Prime Minister Ian Smith of Rhodesia, and the other 12 members of his white minority government cabinet, carried through with their threat to sign the Unilateral Declaration of Independence (UDI), separating the African British colony from the United Kingdom. On the first day of the secession, Smith proclaimed that the government would continue to fly the Union Jack, Britain's flag, that God Save the Queen would continue to be the national anthem, and that Queen Elizabeth would remain the monarch, but would be referred to as "Queen of Rhodesia". Hours later, the UN General Assembly voted 102-2 to condemn the UDI. For the next 14 years, Rhodesia would remain unrecognized by any other nation in the world except for the white-minority ruled nation of South Africa; finally, on December 12, 1979, a British Governor would resume administration of the state as a transition to being granted independence with a black majority governing it as Zimbabwe.
In a by-election to fill the vacancy in Commons caused by the August death of sitting MP Norman Dodds, James Wellbeloved of the ruling Labour Party easily defeated Conservative challenger David Madel and Liberal Stanley Vince, winning 21,835 votes to their 11,763 and 2,823 in the traditionally Labour constituency of Erith and Crayford. If Madel had won, the Labour's 313 seats would have faced 304 from the Conservative and 9 from the Liberals.
Aeroflot Flight 99, a Tupolev Tu-124 operating a scheduled domestic passenger flight en-route from Pulkovo Airport in Leningrad to Murmansk Airport in Murmansk, both in the Soviet Union, crashed while attempting to land. Of the 64 passengers and crew on board, 32 were killed in the accident, and many of the survivors sustained injuries.
Hours later on the same day, United Airlines Flight 227, a Boeing 727, crashed more than  short of the runway at Salt Lake City International Airport and caught fire, killing 43 of the 91 people on board. The flight from New York City to San Francisco ended when the jet's pilot brought the craft in for a hard touchdown, breaking a fuel line and igniting a fire in the fuselage, before lifting up to come around for a second landing.
Previously named "Falling Spikes", Lou Reed, John Cale, Sterling Morrison and Angus Maclise played their first rock concert under their new name, The Velvet Underground.
Gemini launch vehicle (GLV) 7 and Gemini spacecraft No. 7 were electrically mated at complex 19. No Wet Mock Simulated Launch (WMSL) was performed on Gemini VII or any subsequent vehicle. WMSL was replaced by the Simultaneous Launch Demonstration (SLD) and a separate tanking test. For Gemini VII, the SLD was also eliminated because no simultaneous Atlas-Agena launch was planned. The elimination of the erector lowering associated with WMSL made it possible to postpone mechanical mating until later in the test sequence. This had the advantage of allowing access to the spacecraft adapter without demating and remating the spacecraft and launch vehicle, while at the same time permitting integrated testing to continue and shortening the test schedule. The Electrical Interface Integrated Validation and Joint Guidance and Control Test was completed November 13. The Joint Combined Systems Test was run November 15. The only countdown exercise performed for Gemini VII was the GLV tanking test on November 16. The spacecraft Final Systems Test was completed November 20. Spacecraft and launch vehicle were mechanically mated November 22, and the Simulated Flight Test was finished November 27.
Died: Bill Linderman, 45, American rodeo cowboy, in crash of United Airlines Flight 227

November 12, 1965 (Friday)
Venera 2, the Soviet Union's second attempt to gather data on the planet Venus, was launched from the Baikonur Cosmodrome. Although Venera 2 made a flight "so accurate that no mid-course correction was needed" in order to allow a flyby of Venus, all communications were lost after ground control had given the command for photography to begin.
The day after declaring Rhodesia's independence from the United Kingdom, Prime Minister Ian Smith issued an order removing all executive powers from the British colonial governor, Sir Humphrey Gibbs, and asked Gibbs to leave the Government House, the governor's residence.
The United Nations Security Council voted 10–0 (with France abstaining) to adopt Resolution 217, condemning Rhodesia's declaration and calling upon all member nations not to recognize Ian Smith's regime, which the Resolution referred to as "illegal" and "racist".
On November 12 and 13, a symposium on hypergolic rocket ignition at altitude was held at Lockheed. Because too little diagnostic information had been obtained from the flight of Gemini Agena target vehicle (GATV) 5002 to determine the exact nature of the probable hard start, it was not certain that the proposed modification - a return to oxidizer lead - would definitely prevent a recurrence of the malfunctions. Sixteen propulsion specialists (brought together from U.S. Government, industrial, and university organizations) assembled for the symposium and concentrated on clarifying the hard-start phenomenon, isolating possible hard-start mechanisms of the Agena engine, and determining meaningful supporting test programs. They agreed with earlier conclusions on the probable cause of the failure. Their recommendations, with Lockheed's analysis of the GATV 5002 failure, were combined into a proposed GATV engine modification and test program that was presented to Air Force Space Systems Division on November 15.
Died: Syedna Taher Saifuddin, 77, Indian Shi'ite Muslim leader and the Da'i al-Mutlaq of the Dawoodi Bohra sect since 1915

November 13, 1965 (Saturday)
The ship was making its semi-weekly run between Miami and Nassau when the fire broke out at around 2:00 in the morning, and at 6:03, the burning liner capsized and plunged to the bottom of the Atlantic Ocean. Other ships in the area, the cruiser Bahama Star and the Finnish freighter Finnpulp rescued another 459 of the 549 people on board. The blaze would later be traced to the center of the ship in "stateroom 610" which was unoccupied and being used for storage, and had started when mattresses fell over onto a lighting system. The blaze then spread in all directions through the dry wooden panels of the aging cruiser.
The American freighter Skipper K arrived at Key West, Florida, bringing the first 108 Cuban refugees to the United States under the agreement signed between the two nations.  Earlier in the month, refugees had been departing in small boats.
A fleet of ships from the People's Liberation Army Navy of Communist China fought a battle with two Republic of China Navy ships from Taiwan.  The Taiwanese gunship Yongchang and the submarine chaser Yongtai had been dispatched toward Wuqiu, Kinmen, Fujian, Republic of China (Taiwan), near the coast of China's Fujian Province, with the purpose of trying "to draw the PLA Navy into another battle" after an August 6 clash.  The PLA Navy responded with six torpedo boats and ten fast-attack gunboats and, at 11:00 at night, engaged the Yongtai and damaged it.  The Yongchang returned fire and damaged several PLA boats, but was finally sunk by torpedoes, while the Yongtai disengaged after thirty minutes.
British theatre critic Kenneth Tynan broke a taboo by saying the "F-word" on a live television broadcast, touching off a debate in the British press about morality, censorship and social mores.  Tynan was a guest on the late night (10:25) show BBC-3 when moderator Robert Robinson asked him whether, if theatrical censorship were abolished, he would allow a play depicting sexual intercourse.  Tynan replied, "Oh, I think so, certainly.  I doubt if there are very many rational people in this world to whom the word 'f***' is particularly diabolical or revolting or totally forbidden."  Telephone calls to BBC tied up its switchboards, four resolutions were introduced in the House of Commons condemning Tynan and the BBC, and most of the British press responded with outrage.  Tynan had not been the first person to say the word on TV, in that Brendan Behan had mumbled it in 1956 on the BBC show Panorama, and a man told an Ulster TV interviewer in 1959 that his job was "f***ing boring", but it was the first prominent use of that word.  The BBC did not apologize, but did say that "The B.B.C. regrets the use of a word that caused offence in an unscripted part of the television programme", while Tynan responded "I used an old English word in a completely neutral way to illustrate a serious point... To have censored myself would, in my view, have been an insult to the viewers' intelligence."

November 14, 1965 (Sunday)
The Battle of the Ia Drang, the first major engagement of the war between regular United States and North Vietnam forces in the Vietnam War, began in the Ia Drang Valley of the Central Highlands in Vietnam.  Over the next seven days, until the battle was concluded on November 20, there were 305 American soldiers killed in the battle, and 3,561 from the numerically superior North Vietnamese Army.  The battle marked the first time that U.S. forces used B-52 bombers (and their 36,000 pounds of explosives) in a tactical role.  It has been written that the battle "was of critical importance, as it set the precedent for the conduct of the war in Vietnam.  The air mobility concept had proved its worth.  In addition, [General William] Westmoreland believed that the Ia Drang validated his strategy of attrition... that it would not take many more such victories to push the Communists to the brink of defeat."  On the other hand, the General Vo Nguyen Giap of the NVA felt that the battle was "something of a victory because they learned that they could in fact fight the Americans."  The North Vietnamese also concluded "that direct, prolonged exposure in firefights was not a sound strategy" and that guerrilla warfare would be more effective than large scale battles.  In 2002, the battle would be dramatized in the film We Were Soldiers.
The recently formed coalition government of Congolese Prime Minister Évariste Kimba failed a vote of confidence in the Congo Parliament, losing 72-76 in the lower house and 49-58 in the upper house, despite the inclusion of 16 political parties in the cabinet.  Interior Minister Victor Nendaka Bika was asked to form a new government, but before he could do so, Major General Joseph Mobutu overthrew the government on November 24.

November 15, 1965 (Monday)
The United States Supreme Court ruled, 8-0, that the 1950 Subversive Activities Control Act was unconstitutional, and struck down a requirement that members of the Communist Party must register with the U.S. Department of Justice. With Justice Byron White abstaining, the Court held unanimously that the law violated the protections within the Fifth Amendment against self-incrimination.
Walt Disney and Florida Governor Haydon Burns appeared at a press conference in Orlando, Florida, where the master showman unveiled his plans for a $100,000,000 family attraction on 27,000 acres of land adjacent to Bay Lake in Orange County, Florida. Disney's initial vision for his planned "Disney World" was to build two communities which would be called "City of Tomorrow" and "City of Yesterday" and that would exclude motor vehicles other than the parking area for park patrons. Governor Burns told reporters that it was "the most significant day in the history of Florida". The "City of Yesterday" would open in 1971 as "The Magic Kingdom" section of Disney World, while the City of Tomorrow would be finished in 1982 as the "Experimental Prototype Community of Tomorrow", or Epcot.
Lockheed presented its proposed Gemini Agena target vehicle (GATV) engine modification and test program to Colonel A. J. Gardner, Gemini Target Vehicle Program Director, Air Force Space Systems Division (SSD). The proposal was immediately turned over to a three-man team comprising B. A. Hohmann (Aerospace), Colonel J. B. Hudson (Deputy Commander for Launch Vehicles, SSD), and L. E. Root (Lockheed) for consideration. On November 18, the group decided on a final version of the proposal that called for: (1) modifying the Agena engine to provide oxidizer lead during the start sequence, (2) demonstrating sea-level engine flightworthiness in tests at Bell Aerosystems, and (3) conducting an altitude test program at Arnold Engineering Development Center. The final proposal was presented to the GATV Review Board at Manned Spacecraft Center on November 20.
The Sprint (Solid propellant rocket interceptor), a short-range anti-ballistic missile intended to intercept an incoming enemy missile that might get past the Nike Zeus defense, was launched for the first time, in a test firing from the White Sands Missile Range in New Mexico.

November 16, 1965 (Tuesday)
Four days after launching Venera 2 toward Venus, the Soviet Union launched the Venera 3 space probe toward the same planet, marking the first time that the Soviets had sent two interplanetary probes at roughly the same time. On March 1, 1966, Venera 3 would become the first Earth spacecraft to reach the surface of another planet.
Britain's House of Commons and House of Lords passed a bill giving Prime Minister Harold Wilson authority to rule the African colony of Rhodesia by decree, and Queen Elizabeth II gave formal assent on the same day so that the emergency measure would become law. Hours later, as Governor Humphrey Gibbs was awaiting an urgent phone call from Prime Minister Wilson, the phone lines to his residence were cut off by order of Ian Smith.
Following MSC's receipt of the technical proposal for phase C of the Apollo Applications Program (AAP) from North American Aviation, Inc., covering final definition of the AAP command and service module (CSM), William A. Lee, Assistant Manager of the Apollo Spacecraft Program Office, asked several of his staff members to assist in evaluation of the proposal. Such help, he said, would be invaluable in bringing to bear on AAP the experience that the Apollo office had obtained during the effort to develop the block II lunar version of the spacecraft. The technical proposal by North American described those tasks that the company believed were required to define the CSM configuration and to formulate hardware specifications for the development and operations phase of the program. Paralleling these efforts by the contractor, MSC had established a baseline AAP CSM configuration and had laid down several configuration guidelines believed to be fundamental tenets of AAP objectives: no spacecraft modifications to achieve "product improvement" or to obtain statistical "mission success."
An arrest in Merced, California, revealed the lax security at the Castle Air Force Base, part of the U.S. Air Force's Strategic Air Command. The Merced County Sheriff's office would reveal on December 1 what it called "The Case of the Crying Colonel", and the perpetrators of the breach were three junior high school students, two of whom were 13 years old, and their 14-year-old companion. The eldest boy, who "was wearing the complete flying uniform of a lieutenant colonel" when he led police on a high-speed chase in a truck stolen from the base, told police that he and his friends had pedaled their bicycles to Castle AFB, driven a base vehicle to the officers club and stole uniforms and insignia, then returned a few days later dressed as officers, even being saluted as they drove two trucks off of the base. When they were stopped after their third visit, they were found with documents (including flight orders), radio-equipped pilot helmets, and "pieces of nine air force uniforms." The federal government would decline to press charges because of the boys' ages.
Died:
Harry Blackstone Sr., 80, American stage musician and illusionist billed as "The Great Blackstone"
W. T. Cosgrave, 85, the first Prime Minister of Ireland (as President of the Executive Council of the Irish Free State), from 1922 to 1932.

November 17, 1965 (Wednesday)
The United Nations General Assembly voted on a resolution to admit the People's Republic of China as a member.  Prior to the vote on admission, the United States and ten other nations offered a resolution, which passed 56-49, to declare Chinese representation "an important question".  Because of the designation as important, the admission of Communist China would require a two-thirds majority, and the result was 47 in favor, 47 opposed, and 20 abstentions.  The 47-47 tie, still short of the 64 that would have been required, was more favorable to the PRC than the last vote on October 21, 1963, which had failed, 41-57.  As one historian would note later, "The UN vote was a sobering reminder that many countries no longer tolerated Washington's unbending hostility toward Beijing."
The 27 passengers and 11 crewmen of the Boeing 707 nicknamed "Polecat" landed in Honolulu at 10:21 in the morning, almost 62 1/2 hours after departing from the same airport on the first flight around the world to pass over both the North Pole and the South Pole.  Led by pilot Jack Martin, the circumpolar expedition had started from Honolulu at 7:15 on a Sunday evening.  One of the reporters on board, Lowell Thomas Jr. (who broadcast to radio listeners along the way), would recount later that "In all, we traveled 26,230 miles", with a total time of 62:27:35 and actual time in the air at 51 hours, 27 minutes.  The jet had gone from Honolulu to London by way of the North Pole, with more refueling stops at Lisbon, Buenos Aires, and Auckland before arriving at Hawaii.
The economic term "stagflation" was used for the first time, by British MP Iain Macleod, as a portmanteau of the words "stagnation" and "inflation".  Macleod was speaking to the House of Commons about the British economy, noting that "We now have the worst of both worlds— not just inflation on the one side or stagnation on the other side, but both of them together.  We have a sort of 'stagflation' problem."
Died: Hans Nielsen, 53, German film actor

November 18, 1965 (Thursday)
The Second Vatican Council voted to approve two significant changes in Roman Catholic Church doctrine, approving Dei verbum (the Dogmatic Constitution on Divine Revelation) by a vote of 2,344 to 6, and Apostolicam Actuositatem (the Decree on the Apostolate of the Laity) by a margin of 2,340 to 6.
Following formal establishment of the Apollo Applications Program at NASA Headquarters, Associate Administrator for Manned Space Flight George E. Mueller recommended to Administrator James E. Webb and Associate Administrator Robert C. Seamans, Jr., assignment of basic roles and responsibilities to the field centers for carrying out the program. Although such responsibilities were delineated in the traditional manner, the new program responsibility of experiment and payload integration was split between Marshall Space Flight Center (MSFC) and MSC. On 13 December, following discussions with Webb, Seamans approved Mueller's recommended assignments of experiment management and payload integration.
John H. Disher, Saturn/Apollo Applications Deputy Director, requested the Manned Space Flight Management Operations Director to officially change the designation of the Saturn IB/Centaur Office to Saturn Applications. This change, Disher said, reflected the change in status of the office and provided for necessary management of potential Saturn Applications such as the Saturn V/Voyager by the Office of Manned Space Flight. However, on the same day, Disher ordered E. F. O'Connor at MSFC to halt all Saturn IB/Centaur efforts (except those already underway that could not be recalled) and disapproved the request for an additional $1.1 million for the program. (Any funds required for definition of a Saturn V/Voyager mission, he said, would be authorized separately.)
A barge containing  of chlorine gas in cylinders, sunk two months earlier near Baton Rouge, Louisiana, by Hurricane Betsy, was recovered without any harmful effects.
Died: Henry A. Wallace, 77, Vice President of the United States, 1941-1945, former U.S. Secretary of Agriculture, 1933-1941.

November 19, 1965 (Friday)
The Vatican Ecumenical Council voted 1,954 to 249 to give final approval for the Declaration on Religious Liberty issued by the Roman Catholic Church, with a statement recognizing that no person should be forced to act against conscience in matters of faith, nor be prevented from practicing a personal religious belief. The declaration, which would be promulgated by Pope Paul VI on December 7, ended any official objection by the Catholic church to Protestant Christian denominations.
Anthony Greenwood, the British Secretary of State for the Colonies, announced that the colony of British Guiana would be granted independence on May 26, 1966. Greenwood added that although Prime Minister Forbes Burnham would become head of government for the new nation (which would rename itself Guyana), Queen Elizabeth II would continue to be represented by a Governor-General until the end of 1968, at which time all parties agreed that the South American nation could opt to become a presidential republic.
Aerojet-General delivered the stage II engine for Gemini launch vehicle (GLV) 10 to Martin-Baltimore. The stage I engine had been delivered August 23. Martin-Baltimore completed splicing stage I January 12, 1966; stage II splicing, using the fuel tank reassigned from GLV-11, was finished February 2. Engine installation was completed February 7, and stage I horizontal tests February 11. Stage II horizontal testing ended March 2.
Air Force Space Systems Division (SSD) directed Lockheed to return Gemini Agena target vehicle (GATV) 5001 to Sunnyvale, California. The GATV was still being stored in Hanger E, Eastern Test Range, minus its main engine which SSD had directed Lockheed to ship to Bell Aerosystems on November 9 for modification. Although SSD and NASA had considered using GATV 5001 as the second flight vehicle, it needed to be refurbished, repaired, and updated - work which could be done only at the Lockheed plant. A dummy engine was installed to simulate weight and center of gravity, and the vehicle left the Cape by commercial van on November 20, arriving at Sunnyvale November 24.
Born:
Paulo S. L. M. Barreto, Brazilian cryptographer, in Salvador, Bahia
Laurent Blanc, French footballer and football manager, defender for the France national team from 1989 to 2000; in Alès

November 20, 1965 (Saturday)
Michigan State University, ranked #1 in both the Associated Press and United Press International polls, won a share of the unofficial college football championship, defeating #4 Notre Dame, 12-3, to complete its regular season with an unbeaten 10-0-0 record.  At season's end, the final UPI poll of coaches would declare the Michigan State Spartans the nation's top college football team.  The final AP poll of sportswriters, however, would not be taken until after the postseason bowl games, and Michigan State's 14-12 loss in the Rose Bowl, #2 Arkansas' 14-7 loss in the Cotton Bowl, and #4 Alabama's 39-28 win over #3 Nebraska would result in Alabama being declared the national champion by the Associated Press.
The first national college football championship game in Canada, the Canadian College Bowl for the Vanier Cup, was played at Varsity Stadium in Toronto, with the Varsity Blues of the University of Toronto defeating the Golden Bears of the University of Alberta, 14 to 7.  The Vanier Cup had been inaugurated as an invitational bowl game to raise money for the Save the Children Fund to pit the champions of the Western Canadian conference (the Hardy Trophy winner) against the Yates Cup winner from the Ontario Universities conference.
Simon Pierre Tchoungui became the third and final Prime Minister of East Cameroon during the 11-year period when the Federal Republic of Cameroon had separate cabinets for the East and West portions of the African nation.  Tchoungui, who replaced Vincent de Paul Ahanda, would serve until the separate premierships were abolished on June 2, 1972, with the creation of the United Republic of Cameroon.
Born:
Mike D (Michael Diamond), American rapper and co-founder of the Beastie Boys; in New York City
Yoshiki (Yoshiki Hayashi), Japanese heavy metal musician and co-founder of the group X Japan; in Tateyama, Chiba

November 21, 1965 (Sunday)
Pope Paul VI closed the deliberations of the Second Vatican Council, and more than 2,300 Roman Catholic archbishops and clergy from all over the world.
Che Guevara and the last six survivors of his column of Cuban guerrillas withdrew from the Republic of the Congo after an unsuccessful attempt to aid the revolution there.
After 84 days of preparation, the six F-100-F crews who were designated as the "Wild Weasels" strike force were deployed in Vietnam to locate and destroy enemy radar sites.

Radio broadcaster Francis "Chick" Hearn did his first play-by-play reporting of a Los Angeles Laker basketball game (a 110-104 loss to the Philadelphia Warriors), the first of 3,338 consecutive game calls.  Hearn's streak would last past his 85th birthday, until December 16, 2001, three days before scheduled open-heart surgery.  He would return in April 2002, calling the play by play at the Lakers' June 12 NBA championship winning game over the New Jersey Nets, but would pass away on August 5, before the start of the next NBA season.  Hearn is credited by historians with introducing the terms "slam dunk" and "air ball" (for a missed free throw), and the phrase "no harm, no foul".
Mireille Mathieu performed on France's Télé-Dimanche and began her successful singing career.
Born:
Björk (Björk Guðmundsdóttir), Icelandic singer-songwriter, in Reykjavik
Alexander Siddig, Sudanese-born British television and film actor, known for portraying Dr. Bashir on Star Trek: Deep Space Nine; as Siddiq at-Tahir el-Fadil in Khartoum
Yuriko Yamaguchi, Japanese anime voice actress, in Osaka
Died: Cecil Brower, 50, America country music fiddler and pioneer of the "Western swing" genre, died of a perforated ulcer following a Carnegie Hall concert with Jimmy Dean's band.

November 22, 1965 (Monday)
The United States Supreme Court selected four similar petitions for a writ of certiorari to review the issue of the right of an indigent criminal defendant to have an attorney appointed for him at government expense, including that of Ernesto Miranda. What would become known as the "Miranda warning" could have easily been the "Westover warning" or the "Vignera warning", but Miranda's arguments were heard first and the Court's landmark decision of June 13, 1966, would be styled Miranda v. Arizona.
The United Nations Development Programme (UNDP) was established as a specialized agency of the United Nations. Paul G. Hoffman would be its first administrator.
David M. Jones, Acting Saturn/Apollo Applications Director, solicited from the chief executives of the various companies participating in Apollo their views on proposed goals for the Apollo Applications Program. Alternative goals postulated for AAP were (1) to explore and utilize world resources for the benefit of humanity; (2) to define and develop the operational capabilities for the next generation of space vehicles beyond Apollo; (3) to broaden knowledge of near-Earth and lunar environments; (4) to enhance the national security of the United States through space operations; and (5) to develop the capability for crewed flights of up to one year. Jones asked the executives to weigh the pros and cons of these alternative goals and to make a qualitative assessment of the benefits which might accrue to the American taxpayer. NASA would include these assessments in congressional hearings early in 1966.
The musical Man of La Mancha opened off-Broadway at the ANTA Washington Square Theatre in New York City's Greenwich Village and would become a major hit, running for 2,328 performances and winning a Tony Award for its star, Richard Kiley.
Muhammad Ali successfully defended his world heavyweight boxing championship against a former world champion, Floyd Patterson, who had held the title from 1956 to 1959 and again from 1960 to 1962. Patterson, who had promoted the Las Vegas fight as a war over the values of Christianity vs. Islam, lost in the 12th round on a technical knockout.
Born: Mads Mikkelsen, Denmark-born film and television actor, in Copenhagen
Died:
Dipa Nusantara Aidit, 42, senior leader of the Communist Party of Indonesia, the day after he was arrested by the Indonesian national police. The government maintained that he was killed while trying to escape rather than to be tried and sentenced to death, while other reports were that he was promised a trip to Jakarta and then taken to an isolated location and shot to death.
Otto Kirchheimer, 60, German jurist and political scientist who worked for the U.S. Office of Strategic Services during World War II and later for the Central Intelligence Agency.

November 23, 1965 (Tuesday)
After reaching a tentative agreement to end the Yemen Civil War by holding a plebiscite for voters to decide on whether Yemen should be a republic or a monarchy, representatives of the Yemen Arab Republic and of the former Kingdom of Yemen met at the Yemeni town of Harad to discuss how the election would be organized, but would never reach an agreement.
Born: Don Frye, American mixed martial artist, professional wrestler, boxer and kickboxer; in Sierra Vista, Arizona

Died: Elisabeth of Bavaria, Queen of Belgium, 89, queen consort during the reign of her husband, King Albert I, from 1909 to 1934, mother of King Leopold III and grandmother of King Baudoin I.  During World War I, when her native land of Germany invaded Belgium, she established surgical centers for the Belgian soldiers at the front lines, and during World War II, she helped numerous Belgians, particularly Belgian Jews, escape from Nazi occupiers; the city of Elisabethville in the Belgian Congo was named in her honor, and would be renamed Lubumbashi a year after her death.

November 24, 1965 (Wednesday)
At the age of 35, Lieutenant General Joseph-Desiré Mobutu met with 14 fellow members of the Armée Nationale Congolaise high command in Léopoldville in an emergency session and decided to break the deadlock between the Congolese Parliament and President Kasavubu by staging a bloodless coup d'état. By dawn the next morning, the Army had seized Radio Leopoldville and it was announced that Mobutu declared himself to be the new President of the Democratic Republic of Congo and had removed Kasuvubu and Prime Minister Kimba from office. During his 31-year rule, Mobutu would dismiss the parliament, suspend the constitution, ban all political parties in favor of the Mouvement Populaire de la Révolution, promote himself with a personality cult, inaugurate his own authenticité campaign, rename the nation to Zaire and require his citizens to adopt "African" names (including calling himself Mobutu Sese Seko), and amass a large personal fortune while bankrupting his country. Mobutu's rule would end on May 16, 1997; he would flee into exile in the face of an invasion by rebel forces, and die of prostate cancer less than four months later.
Lockheed submitted an engineering change proposal to Air Force Space Systems Division (SSD) for Project Surefire, code name for the Gemini Agena Target Vehicle (GATV) Modification and Test Program designed to correct the malfunction which had caused the failure of GATV 5002 on October 25. SSD gave Lockheed a tentative go-ahead for Project Surefire on November 27 and established an emergency priority for completing the program. On the same day, Lockheed announced the formation of a Project Surefire Engine Development Task Force to carry out the program. Work was geared to meet the scheduled launch of GATV 5003 for Gemini VIII. GATV 5003 systems testing was halted. The main engine was removed November 23 and shipped to Bell Aerosystems for modification. Work on GATV 5004 was reprogrammed to allow it to complete final assembly with a modified engine.
Twenty-one people were killed, and 33 injured, in an explosion and fire at a crowded national guard armory in Keokuk, Iowa, where they were attending a square dance. The cause of the accident was later traced to natural gas that had leaked into the building through porous rock beneath the tile in the armory, and that had been ignited when a space heater had been turned on.
A United States military spokesman reported that 240 American servicemen had been killed in the Vietnam War during the week of November 14 to November 20, in the deadliest week of the war for Americans up to that time. During the four years of 1961, 1962, 1963 and 1964, there had been 244 U.S. deaths, only slightly more than the casualties for the week. The newest casualties raised the toll to 1,335 dead and 6,131 wounded.
Died: Abdullah III Al-Salim Al-Sabah, 70, Emir of Kuwait since 1950. He was succeeded as King by his brother, Prime Minister Sabah Al-Salim Al-Sabah, who took the constitutional oath of office on November 27.

November 25, 1965 (Thursday)
General Lon Nol, Chief of Staff of the Royal Cambodian Army, concluded an agreement with Luo Ruiqing, the Chief of Staff of China's People's Liberation Army, stipulating that Cambodia would permit the passage of Viet Cong and North Vietnamese Army troops through its border regions, and that it would allow China to ship war supplies to Vietnam through Cambodian territory.  Lon Nol had traveled to Beijing at the request of Prince Norodom Sihanouk.
In his first test since being appointed Prime Minister of Northern Ireland in 1963, Terence O'Neill increased his hold on power in the elections for the Parliament of Northern Ireland.  O'Neill's Ulster Unionist Party won 36 of the 52 available seats to obtain a 59% majority, up from a 48.8% plurality before the vote.
The Army of Peru began redeployment to the Ayacucho Region of Peru in order to surround rebel guerrillas of the Ejército de Liberación Nacional (ELN), the "National Liberation Army" movement that had been fighting the government since 1962.
Born: 
Cris Carter, American NFL receiver and Hall of Fame member, in Troy, Ohio
 Tim Armstrong, American punk rock musician (Rancid), in Albany, California
Died: Dame Myra Hess, 75, English pianist.

November 26, 1965 (Friday)

France became the third nation to place a spacecraft into orbit around the Earth, as it launched a  satellite, Astérix-1, from the CIEES launch facility in Hammaguir, Algeria. The primary mission of the Asterix probe, which carried radio and radar transmitters, was to test the effectiveness of the Diamant-A rocket. Although France was the third nation to launch its own satellite, the United Kingdom, Canada and Italy had each contracted with the United States to send spacecraft into orbit from Cape Canaveral, Florida. "Unfortunately," an author would note later, "the satellite only operated for two days. A-1 is still in orbit and will be for centuries to come, since an antenna malfunction does not allow any commands to the satellite."
Webster Bivens was arrested by a team of FBI agents who entered his Brooklyn apartment and searched the premises without a search warrant, giving rise to a landmark U.S. Supreme Court decision in 1971 in the case of Bivens v. Six Unknown Named Agents. The Court would rule that, although there was no specific federal law that permitted Bivens to file suit against the government for a violation of his Fourth Amendment protections against unreasonable searches and seizures, the constitutional amendment itself provided an implied right of action. The Court precedent would extend to similar interpretations of other Bill of Rights guarantees.
McDonnell proposed building a backup target vehicle for Gemini rendezvous missions. The augmented target docking adapter (ATDA) would serve as an alternative to the Gemini Agena target vehicle (GATV) if efforts to remedy the GATV problem responsible for the October 25 mission abort did not meet the date scheduled for launching Gemini VIII. Using Gemini-qualified equipment, the ATDA (as its name implied) was essentially a target docking adapter (TDA) with such additions as were needed to stabilize it and allow the spacecraft to acquire and dock with it. In addition to the shroud and TDA, these included a communications system (comprising tracking, telemetry transmission, and command subsystems), instrumentation, a guidance and control system (made up of a target stabilization system and rendezvous radar transponder), electrical system, and a reaction control system identical to the Gemini spacecraft's. Robert C. Seamans, Jr., NASA Associate Administrator, approved the procurement of the ATDA on December 9, and McDonnell began assembling it December 14.
Died: William C. Marland, 47, former Governor of West Virginia (1953-1957) who had suffered from alcoholism, and who later worked as a taxicab driver in Chicago (1962-1965) during his recovery.

November 27, 1965 (Saturday)
In an act which it said was being done as a "response to the friendly sentiments of the American people against the war in South Vietnam", the Viet Cong released U.S. Army Sergeant George E. Smith and Specialist E-5 Claude E. McClure, who had both been captured on November 24, 1963. Vietnam Communist Party official Le Duc Tho escorted Smith and McClure across the border from North Vietnam into Cambodia, freeing both men after two years as prisoners of war. Smith and McClure would travel across neutral Cambodia on their own and would address a press conference in Phnom Penh on November 30, praising their captors and American antiwar protesters, and criticizing the war effort. On December 27, the U.S. military command announced that Smith and McClure would face court martial for aiding the enemy.
The entire 7th ARVN Regiment of the South Vietnamese Army was killed in a battle with Viet Cong and North Vietnamese Army troops who surrounded the 1,000-man unit at the Michelin rubber plantation in the Dau Tieng district of South Vietnam. Associated Press photographer Horst Faas would begin his report the next day with the words, "South Viet Nam's 7th regiment died at 8 a.m. yesterday," and note that "Most of the Vietnamese troopers, with their American advisers, fought to the last bullet." People taken prisoner were gathered together and machine-gunned.
The "March on Washington for Peace in Vietnam", organized by the "Committee for a SANE Nuclear Policy" (SANE), attracted a crowd of almost 35,000 demonstrators who picketed the White House, then moved on toward the Washington Monument. It was the largest public protest against U.S. involvement in Vietnam up to that time. The leaders of SANE were concerned about the public perception of the antiwar movement, so they asked that protesters only carry signs with "authorized slogans", and not to demand immediate withdrawal, nor to burn the American flag.
Officials from the Pentagon told U.S. President Lyndon B. Johnson that if planned major sweep operations to neutralize Viet Cong forces during the next year were to succeed, the number of American troops in Vietnam would have to be increased from 120,000 to 400,000.
Died: Marion Probert, 32, American football player and surgeon, in plane crash

November 28, 1965 (Sunday)
What was described as "an unprecedented mass meeting of racial unity in the South" took place in Charlotte, North Carolina, as an evenly split crowd of 2,000 white and African-American community leaders, church officials, businessmen, and professionals gathered in an auditorium to condemn the bombing of four black leaders' homes the previous Monday, belonging to a city councilman, a U.S. commissioner, a physician, and the state NAACP chapter president.  During the televised event, NAACP Executive Secretary Roy Wilkins, and Charlotte Mayor Stan Brookshire told the crowd that "We will intensify our efforts to provide equal rights for all."  After the group, "about evenly split between whites and Negroes" sang and prayed, one black leader noted, "I've never seen anything like it in the South."  
In response to U.S. President Lyndon B. Johnson's call for "more flags" in Vietnam, Philippines President-elect Ferdinand Marcos announced that he would send troops to help fight in South Vietnam.
Léonard Mulamba (later Mulamba Nyunyi wa Kadima) was appointed the new Prime Minister of the Congo by President Mobutu, but would serve less than a year.  Mobutu would later send Mulamba as an ambassador to India, then Japan, and Brazil.

November 29, 1965 (Monday)
What had started on November 10 as a criticism of Chinese playwright Wu Han in an obscure Shanghai newspaper was published across the People's Republic by order of Chairman Mao Zedong, in Peking's daily newspaper, Beijing Ribao and the People's Liberation Army Daily (Jiefangjun Bao). The next day, the official Chinese Communist Party newspaper, People's Daily (Renmin Ribao), published the criticism as well.
General Christophe Soglo removed Sourou-Migan Apithy from his job as President of Dahomey (now Benin) and temporarily replaced him with National Assembly Speaker Tahirou Congacou, whom he would remove on December 22.
The United States and all but five members of the United Nations General Assembly voted in favor of a UN resolution calling for a world disarmament conference that would include an invitation to the People's Republic of China, whose admission to the UN had been opposed by the U.S. and other western nations. The vote of participants was a unanimous 112-0. France abstained, Taiwan's delegation announced that it would not participate, and the delegations of Cambodia, The Gambia, and Paraguay were absent.
Director Robert R. Gilruth, Manned Spacecraft Center, requested the concurrence of NASA Headquarters in plans for doffing the G5C pressure suits during orbital flight in Gemini VII. Both astronauts wanted to remove their suits after the second sleep period and don them only for transient dynamic conditions, specifically rendezvous and reentry. The primary concern was preventing the degradation of crew performance by maintaining crew comfort during the long-duration mission. Gemini Program Office had participated in the G5C suit program and certified the suit for intravehicular crewed flight in the Gemini spacecraft on November 19. When Gemini VII was launched on December 4, the mission plan required one astronaut to be suited at all times, but on December 12 NASA Headquarters authorized both crew members to have their suits off at the same time.
NASA Associate Administrator for Manned Space Flight George E. Mueller requested of MSC Director Robert R. Gilruth that his Center identify additional Apollo subsystems testing and the best method of conducting such tests on the basic subsystems of the spacecraft beyond the 14-day requirements of the Apollo lunar mission. Mueller explained that planning for the Apollo Applications Program projected that extended missions could be performed using basic Apollo hardware and that significant advantages might be realized by testing subsystems to determine their duration limits, thereby avoiding the burden of additional test units and test facilities.
In response to a telegram from Deputy Associate Administrator for Manned Space Flight James C. Elms regarding procurement plans for the AAP, MSC Deputy Director George M. Low described a plan being seriously considered by Houston that would permit competitive procurement of follow-on Apollo hardware. The plan called for awarding the phase C contract to North American to define AAP changes to the CSM and letting what Low termed "phase-in" contracts leading to proposals on how the spacecraft could be manufactured by other companies. Upon completion of both the phase C work at North American and the phase-in contracts with other firms, MSC would enter into competitive negotiations with all parties to determine which firm should build the AAP version of the CSM. (According to Low, it was premature to undertake a phase C definition effort with Grumman at this time, but he suggested that a competitive effort similar to that proposed for the CSM could be implemented somewhat later.)
The Canadian satellite Alouette 2 was launched from Vandenberg Air Force Base in California.

November 30, 1965 (Tuesday)
Unsafe at Any Speed, the exposé by attorney and auto safety advocate Ralph Nader, was released by Grossman Publishers and became a bestseller.  The most dangerous cars on the road were identified by Nader, with special attention given to models of the Chevrolet Corvair.  Nader criticized both the American auto industry and federal government agencies that were trusted with enforcing motor vehicle safety.
Temple University, the second largest private university in the United States, became a public university within Pennsylvania's Commonwealth System of Higher Education, joining Penn State and Pitt as state-supported institutions.  Tuition was cut by more than half for Pennsylvania residents, and increased by almost 20% for non-residents.
SEAMEO, the Southeast Asian Ministers of Education Organization, was established to promote cooperation in education, science, and culture in the Southeast Asian region.
Born:
Ben Stiller, American actor, in New York City
Fumihito, Prince Akishino, Japanese prince and, as brother of Naruhito, Crown Prince of Japan, the second in line for the Imperial throne; in Chiyoda, Tokyo
Died:
Walter Inglis Anderson, 62, American painter, in New Orleans, Louisiana
Daniel Webster Whitney, 71, American cubist painter, in Covington, Louisiana

References

1965
1965-11
1965-11